A television drama is a television genre.

Television drama or TV drama may also refer:
Arab television drama
Chinese television drama
Hong Kong television drama
Japanese television drama
Korean television drama
Philippine television drama
Turkish television drama